Khaing Thazin (born 18 July 1996) is a Burmese footballer who plays as a defender for the Myanmar women's national team.

International goals
Scores and results list Myanmar's goal tally first.

See also
List of Myanmar women's international footballers

References

1996 births
Living people
Women's association football defenders
Burmese women's footballers
Sportspeople from Yangon
Myanmar women's international footballers